Harry Max Harrison (born Henry Maxwell Dempsey; March 12, 1925 – August 15, 2012) was an American science fiction author,  known mostly for his character The Stainless Steel Rat and for his novel Make Room! Make Room! (1966). The latter was the rough basis for the motion picture Soylent Green (1973). Long resident in both Ireland and the United Kingdom, Harrison was involved in the foundation of the Irish Science Fiction Association, and was, with Brian Aldiss, co-president of the Birmingham Science Fiction Group.

Aldiss called him "a constant peer and great family friend". His friend Michael Carroll said of Harrison's work: "Imagine Pirates of the Caribbean or Raiders of the Lost Ark, and picture them as science-fiction novels. They're rip-roaring adventures, but they're stories with a lot of heart." Novelist Christopher Priest wrote in an obituary

Career

Before becoming an editor and writer, Harrison started in the science fiction field as an illustrator, notably with EC Comics' two science fiction comic book series, Weird Fantasy and Weird Science. In these and other comic book stories, he most often worked with Wally Wood. Wood usually inked over Harrison's layouts, and the two freelanced for several publishers and genres, including westerns and horror comics. He and Wood split up their partnership in 1950 and went their separate ways. Harrison used house pen names such as Wade Kaempfert and Philip St. John to edit magazines and published other fiction under the pen names Felix Boyd and Hank Dempsey (see Personal Life below). Harrison ghostwrote Vendetta for the Saint, one of the long-running series of novels featuring Leslie Charteris' character The Saint. Harrison also wrote for syndicated comic strips, writing several stories for the character Rick Random.

His first short story, "Rock Diver", was published in the February 1951 issue of Worlds Beyond, edited by Damon Knight; the magazine had previously published his illustrations. While in New York, he socialized at the Hydra Club, an organization of New York's science fiction writers, including Isaac Asimov, Alfred Bester, James Blish, Anthony Boucher, Avram Davidson, Judith Merril, and Theodore Sturgeon.

Harrison has become much better known for his later writing, particularly for his humorous and satirical science fiction, such as the Stainless Steel Rat series and his novel Bill, the Galactic Hero—which satirized Robert A. Heinlein's novel Starship Troopers. Priest wrote:

Adi Robertson agreed: "His books toed the line between science fiction adventure, humor, and satire, often with a strong anti-military bent informed by his time in the US Army Air Corps."

During the 1950s and 1960s, he was the main writer of the Flash Gordon newspaper strip. One of his Flash Gordon scripts was serialized in Comics Revue magazine. Harrison drew sketches to help the artist be more scientifically accurate, which the artist largely ignored.

Not all of Harrison's writing was comic, though. He wrote many stories on serious themes, of which by far the best known is the novel about overpopulation and consumption of the world's resources, Make Room! Make Room! (1966), which was used as a basis for the 1973 science fiction film Soylent Green (though the film changed the plot and theme).

For a time Harrison was closely associated with Brian Aldiss. They collaborated on a series of anthology projects and did much in the 1970s to raise the standards of criticism in the field, including institution of the John W. Campbell Memorial Award for Best Science Fiction Novel. Priest wrote, "In 1965 Harrison and Aldiss published the first issue (of two) of the world's first serious journal of SF criticism, SF Horizons. Together they edited many anthologies of short stories, each one illustrating the major themes of SF, and although not intended as critical apparatus the books were a way of delineating the unique material of the fantastic. As committed internationalists, the two men created World SF, an organisation of professionals intended to encourage and enhance the writing of non-anglophone SF." In particular, the two edited nine volumes of The Year's Best Science Fiction anthology series as well as three volumes of the Decade series, collecting science fiction of the 1940s, 1950s and 1960s respectively.

In 1990, Harrison was the professional Guest of Honor at ConFiction, the 48th World SF Convention, in The Hague, Netherlands, together with Joe Haldeman and Wolfgang Jeschke.

Harrison did not win a major genre award for any specific work of fiction. The Science Fiction Hall of Fame inducted Harrison in 2004 and the Science Fiction and Fantasy Writers of America named him its 26th SFWA Grand Master in 2008 (presentation of the Damon Knight Award following in 2009). He became a cult hero in Russia, where he won the 2008 Golden Roscon award for lifetime achievement in science fiction.

Personal life

Early life
Harrison was born March 12, 1925, as Henry Maxwell Dempsey in Stamford, Connecticut. His father, Henry Leo Dempsey, a printer who was three-fourths of Irish descent, changed his name to Harrison soon after Harry was born. Harry did not know this himself until he was 30 years old, at which point he changed his name to Harry Max Harrison in court. His mother, Ria H. (Kirjassoff), was Russian Jewish. She had been born in Riga, Latvia, and grew up in St. Petersburg, Russia. Her brother, Max David Kirjassoff (1888-1923), had been an American consul in Japan, but he died along with his wife Alice during the 1923 Great Kantō earthquake in 1923.

After finishing Forest Hills High School in 1943, Harrison was drafted into the U.S. Army Air Forces during World War II as a gunsight technician and as a gunnery instructor. Priest adds that he became a sharpshooter, a military policeman, and a specialist in the prototypes of computer-aided bomb-sights and gun turrets. "But overall the army experience vested in him a hatred of the military that was to serve him well as a writer later on."

In 1946 he enrolled in Hunter College in New York City and later ran a studio selling illustrations to comics and science fiction magazines.

Marriages
Harrison married Evelyn Harrison, whom he included in a cartoon he drew of the Hydra Club in 1950. They divorced in 1951, and Evelyn married the science fiction writer Lester del Rey shortly afterwards.

Harrison married Joan Merkler Harrison in 1954.  Their marriage lasted until her death of cancer in 2002. They had two children, Todd (born in 1955) and Moira (born in 1959), to whom he dedicated his novel Make Room! Make Room!.

Esperanto
In his middle years, Harrison became an advocate of Esperanto, claiming to "write and speak it with an automatic ease I have never been able to capture in any language other than my native English"; he learned it, according to Christopher Priest, out of boredom during military service. The language often appears in his novels, particularly in his Stainless Steel Rat and Deathworld series.

He was the honorary president of the Esperanto Association of Ireland, where he had moved in the 1970s, living with his family for a number of years in a then-state-of-the-art home he built in the Vale of Avoca in County Wicklow. He also held memberships in other Esperanto organizations such as Esperanto-USA (formerly the "Esperanto League for North America"), of which he was an honorary member, and the Universala Esperanto-Asocio (World Esperanto Association), of whose Honorary Patrons' Committee he was a member.

Residences
Harrison resided in many parts of the world including Mexico, England, Italy, Denmark, and Ireland.

Priest writes that Harrison made many household moves abroad:

After many years of moving around and raising children, he spent most of his later years residing in Ireland. Because Harrison had an Irish grandparent, he was able to assume citizenship, and by taking advantage of the Irish tax exemption for artists, he enjoyed tax-free status.

Harrison also kept an apartment in London for many years, and later in Brighton, these being used for his frequent visits to England, and when Joan died in 2002, his British home became permanent.

Harrison's official website, launched at the Irish national convention a few years earlier, announced his death on August 15, 2012 at his apartment in Brighton, England.

On learning of his death on August 15, 2012, Harlan Ellison said, "It's a day without stars in it."

Bibliography

Novels

Novellas
 The Man from P.I.G. and The Man from R.O.B.O.T. (1974): These two linked novellas, featuring interstellar intelligence agents, were comedy-drama take-offs on The Man from U.N.C.L.E.  The first tells of an agent of the Porcine Interstellar Guard, who performs his missions with the help of several pigs.  The second tells of Henry Venn, an agent for "Robot Obtrusion Battalion—Omega Three", who poses as an interplanetary robot salesman while searching for a missing Galactic Census official on a planet populated by paranoid colonists.  They were originally published as novelettes, in Analog, July 1967 and July 1969, respectively.
 Planet Story (1978), published as a large format book with colour illustrations by Jim Burns

Short story collections
See List of short stories by Harry Harrison
 Two Tales and Eight Tomorrows (1965)
 War with the Robots (1967)
 Prime Number (1970)
 One Step from Earth (1970)
 The Best of Harry Harrison (1976)
 Stainless Steel Visions (1992)
 Galactic Dreams (1994)
 50 In 50  (2001)

Omnibus volumes
 The Deathworld Trilogy (1974): Omnibus of Deathworld, Deathworld 2 & Deathworld 3) (vt. The Deathworld Omnibus, 1999) (the BenBella [2005] edition adds the short story `The Mothballed Spaceship' from Astounding: The John W. Campbell Memorial Anthology (1973))
 The Adventures of the Stainless Steel Rat (1978) - omnibus collection of The Stainless Steel Rat, The Stainless Steel Rat's Revenge and The Stainless Steel Rat Saves the World
 To the Stars (1991) - omnibus collection of the three "To The Stars" novels
 Warriors of the Way (1995), with "John Holm", a pseudonym of Tom Shippey: Omnibus of The Hammer and the Cross and One King's Way
 A Stainless Steel Trio (2002) - omnibus collection of A Stainless Steel Rat is Born, The Stainless Steel Rat Gets Drafted and The Stainless Steel Rat Sings the Blues

Comics
 Rick Random with artist Ron Turner (trade paperback: October 2008)
 Flash Gordon (1958–1964), reprinted in Comics Revue.
 The Stainless Steel Rat (1979–1985) was adapted into a comic strip in the magazine 2000 AD by Kelvin Gosnell, with artist Carlos Ezquerra (trade paperback: July 2010)
 Harry Harrison's Bill, The Galactic Hero Comics; 3 issues

Miscellanea
 You Can Be The Stainless Steel Rat: An Interactive Game Book 1988 - choose your own adventure style interactive novel
 Short story: The Return of the Stainless Steel Rat 1981 - published in Ares  Magazine #10 by Simulations Publications Incorporated. The magazine issue included a solitaire paragraph game designed by Greg Costikyan

Non-fiction books
 Ahead of Time, with Theodore J. Gordon (Doubleday, 1972)
 SF Horizons, with Brian W. Aldiss (Arno Press, 1975), . A photographic reprint of the two issues of a critical magazine published in 1964 and 1965.
 Hell's Cartographers: Some Personal Histories of Science Fiction Writers, with Brian Aldiss (Harper & Row, 1976) .
 Great Balls of Fire! A History of Sex in Science Fiction Illustration (Pierrot Publishing, ; Grosset & Dunlap, ; both 1977)
 Mechanismo: An Illustrated Manual of Science Fiction Hardware (Reed Books, 1978)  — technical illustrations by Brian Lewis
 Spacecraft in Fact and Fiction, with Malcolm Edwards (Exeter Books, 1979) 
 Harry Harrison! Harry Harrison!: A Memoir, (Tor, 2014)

Anthologies (as editor)
 John W. Campbell: Collected Editorials from Analog (1966)
 Nebula Award Stories Two (1967) (with Brian Aldiss) (vt, Nebula Award Stories 1967)
 Apeman, Spaceman (1968) (with Leon Stover)
 Best SF: 1967 (1968) (vt, The Year's Best Science Fiction) (with Brian Aldiss)
 Farewell Fantastic Venus (1968) (abr as vt, All About Venus, 1968)
 SF: Author's Choice (1968) (vt, A Backdrop of Stars)
 Best SF: 1968 (1969) (rev vt, The Year's Best Science Fiction No. 2) (with Brian Aldiss)
 Blast Off: SF for Boys (1969)
 Four for the Future (1969)
 Worlds of Wonder (1969)
 Best SF: 1969 (1970) (vt, The Year's Best Science Fiction No. 3) (with Brian Aldiss)
 Nova 1 (1970) (rev edition 1976, UK hc)
 SF: Author's Choice 2 (1970)
 The Year 2000 (1970)
 Best SF: 1970 (1971) (vt, The Year's Best Science Fiction No. 4) (with Brian Aldiss)
 The Light Fantastic (1971)
 SF: Author's Choice 3 (1971)
 The Astounding-Analog Reader, Volume One (1972) (with Brian Aldiss) (later split into two paperbacks: The Astounding-Analog Reader, Book 1 & The Astounding-Analog Reader, Book 2)
 Ahead of Time (1972)
 Best SF: 1971 (1972) (vt, The Year's Best Science Fiction No. 5) (with Brian Aldiss)
 Nova 2 (1972)
 The Astounding-Analog Reader, Volume Two (1973) (with Brian Aldiss) (only one edition; NOT the same book as The Astounding-Analog Reader, Book 2 above)
 Astounding: John W. Campbell Memorial Anthology (1973) (vt, The John W. Campbell Memorial Anthology)
 Best SF: 1972 (1973) (vt, The Year's Best S.F. 1972) (with Brian Aldiss)
 Nova 3 (1973) (vt, The Outdated Man)
 A Science Fiction Reader (1973) (with Carol Pugner)
 Best SF: 1973 (1974) (abr vt, The Year's Best Science Fiction No. 7) (with Brian Aldiss)
 Nova 4 (1974)
 SF: Author's Choice 4 (1974)
 Best SF: 1974 (1975) (abr vt, The Year's Best Science Fiction No. 8) (with Brian Aldiss)
 Decade: The 1940s (1975) (with Brian Aldiss)
 Hell's Cartographers: Some Personal Histories of Science Fiction Writers (1975) (with Brian Aldiss) (memoirs by SF writers)
 Science Fiction Novellas (1975) (with Willis E. McNelly)
 Best SF: 1975, The Ninth Annual (1976) (vt, The Year's Best Science Fiction No. 9) (with Brian Aldiss)
 Decade: The 1950s (1976) (with Brian Aldiss)
 Decade: The 1960s (1977) (with Brian Aldiss)
 There Won't Be War (1991) (with Bruce McAllister)

See also
 Societics

References

External links

 
 Harry Harrison News Blog – About: "maintained by Paul Tomlinson and Michael Carroll, who also maintain Harry's official website at www.harryharrison.com"
 
 "Worlds Beside Worlds" (Harry Harrison describes how "Tunnel Through the Deeps" was written)
  July 6, 1997, Dublin, Ireland
 Samples of works published as e-books

 Biography and criticism
 
 Stover, Leon. Harry Harrison. Boston: Twayne, 1990.

 Bibliography and works
 
 Harry Harrison Papers at the University of South Florida
 
 
 

1925 births
2012 deaths
20th-century American male writers
20th-century American novelists
21st-century American Jews
21st-century American male writers
21st-century American novelists
American alternate history writers
American comics artists
American comics writers
American Esperantists
American male novelists
American military police officers
American parodists
American people of Irish descent
American people of Russian-Jewish descent
American science fiction writers
American speculative fiction editors
Comedy fiction writers
EC Comics
Environmental fiction writers
Irish Jews
Irish fantasy writers
Irish science fiction writers
Irish speculative fiction editors
Jewish American novelists
Novelists from Connecticut
Parody novelists
Science fiction editors
Science Fiction Hall of Fame inductees
SFWA Grand Masters
United States Army Air Forces personnel of World War II
United States Army Air Forces soldiers
Writers from Stamford, Connecticut
Inkpot Award winners